is a 2006 Japanese drama film directed by Shinji Aoyama.

Plot

Cast
 Kyōka Suzuki as Kaoru 
 Tsutomu Yamazaki as Blind Man 
 Masanobu Andō as Taichi 
 Ayumi Ito as Eiko

Production
Crickets was filmed in 1.33:1 aspect ratio.

Release
Crickets debuted in Orizzonti section at the 63rd Venice International Film Festival on September 8, 2006.

Reception
Film Comment named the film as one of "19 Films to Look Out For" in 2007. Japanese film critic Shigehiko Hasumi said, "Crickets can be seen as a bold reply to Sokurov’s The Sun."

References

External links
 
 

Films directed by Shinji Aoyama
2006 drama films
2006 films
Japanese drama films
2000s Japanese-language films
2000s Japanese films